Smack was a Finnish rock band that was active from 1982 to 1990. The band's original line-up consisted of singer Claude, guitarists Kartsa and Manchuria, bassist Cheri and drummer Kinde.

Discography

 Smack On You (Cityboy, 1984)
 Rattlesnake Bite (Cityboy, 1985)
 Salvation (Eden, 1987)
 Radical (CBS, 1988)
 Live Desire Live Tavastia 1986 (Cityboy 1986)

Compilations

 The Collection – State of Independence (Cityboy, 1988)
 Two Originals – Salvation & Radical (Columbia, 1992)
 In Your Face 1982–1990 (Sony BMG, 2007)

Singles and EPs

 Criminal (Cityboy, 1984, 7"; reissued in 1997 via Zen Garden)
 Walking on the Wire (Cityboy, 1985, 12")
 Stepping Stone (Cityboy, 1985, 7")
 Paint It Black (Cityboy, 1986, 12")
 The Only Salvation (Eden, 1987, 7")
 Look Around (Eden, 1987, 7")
 Mad Animal Shuffle (CBS, 1988, 7")
 I Want Somebody (CBS, 1988, 7")
 Little Sister (CBS, 1988, 7")
 Can You Dig It (Columbia, 1989, CD single)

In pop culture
Nirvana covered Smack's song "Run Rabbit Run" at some performances in 1988.

The lead singer of Danish cowpunk band D-A-D, Jesper Binzer, said on his radio show that Smack was the reason for starting the band. This happened on 12 March 2017 on his radio show MyRock MyWay on the Danish radio channel MyRock.

References

External links
 smackonyou.com

Finnish musical groups